John Walter Knapp (8 March 1841 – 22 June 1881) was an English cricketer.  Knapp's batting style is unknown; he bowled right-arm fast. The son of Tyrell Knapp and Harriett Harris, he was born in Paddington, London. In 1859 he attended Exeter College, Oxford.
 
Knapp made a single first-class appearance for Middlesex against Hampshire in 1864 at the Cattle Market Ground in Islington. In Middlesex's only innings he scored 3 runs before being run out, with Middlesex inflicting a defeat by an innings and 38 runs on a Hampshire side, who like Middlesex were playing in their first season of first-class cricket.

Knapp married a Kate M. Taylor at Woodmansterne, Surrey on 30 July 1878. He died at St Leonards-on-Sea, Sussex on 22 June 1881, aged 40.

References

External links
John Knapp at ESPNcricinfo
John Knapp at CricketArchive

1841 births
1881 deaths
People from Paddington
Cricketers from Greater London
Alumni of Exeter College, Oxford
English cricketers
Middlesex cricketers